The Bridge in West Mead Township was a historic metal truss bridge spanning French Creek at West Mead Township, Crawford County, Pennsylvania. It was built by the Penn Bridge Company of Beaver Falls, Pennsylvania. It has been demolished.

It was added to the National Register of Historic Places in 1988.

References

External links
HABS 13 photos and data file

Road bridges on the National Register of Historic Places in Pennsylvania
Bridges completed in 1888
Bridges in Crawford County, Pennsylvania
National Register of Historic Places in Crawford County, Pennsylvania
Truss bridges in the United States
Metal bridges in the United States